is a fictional character in the Street Fighter series. She made her first appearance in 1999's Street Fighter III: 3rd Strike. In the series, she is a young Japanese woman raised from the Tosa Province of Japan who utilizes her family's dojo teachings of Rindo-kan karate as her fighting style. Voiced by Makoto Tsumura in Japanese, Makoto speaks in Tosa dialect.

Appearances

Street Fighter games 
Makoto is a young female karate master from the rural Tosa Province of Japan introduced in Street Fighter III: 3rd Strike. She returns as a playable character in Super Street Fighter IV in which her father  was the previous master of the once prosperous  karate dojo, which has greatly dwindled in attendance ever since the death of Makoto's father. With her brother having chosen not to follow the path of a martial artist by focusing more on the career of a business man, Makoto is left with the sole task of reviving her school's popularity. In her ending, Makoto becomes a young martial arts prodigy after defeating Ryu and numerous other fighters, attracting countless numbers of students interested in learning the art of the Rindōkan school. In Super Street Fighter IV, Fei-Long acts as Makoto's rival.

Character design
Makoto's conception as a character included many varied design drafts during the development of Street Fighter III, but "loose-fitting karate gi and a determination to fix up her rundown dojo were ideas that existed from the beginning." She is tomboyish, wearing a white dōgi and a yellow hachimaki. The hachimaki is a trademark of Makoto's design, added in 3rd Strike by the development team to demonstrate her speed and trajectory. They used its fluttering as she charged up her Hayate technique as an example. Because there was nothing in the Street Fighter IV engine that allowed them to do that, they had to create this mechanic especially for her. Before the release of 3rd Strike, rumors were circulating among players that Makoto was Ryu's younger sister, due to her similar wardrobe. Makoto's first alternate costume in Super Street Fighter IV, consisting of a sun hat, denim overalls, and gardening gloves, was the hardest to create out of all the characters' outfits.

Makoto's voice, provided by Makoto Tsumura, is identified by her Tosa dialect (Tosa-ben). In order to achieve this, the development team hired a professional in country dialect to supervise the sound recording team. She was the only character in the game to have to be translated into Tosa-ben. Her voice was the hardest of all the characters in Super Street Fighter IV to record.

Gameplay
In Street Fighter III: 3rd Strike, Makoto features a unique fighting style, resulting in her having a fan following, according to battle director Taisaku Okada. Battle planner Atsushi Tamamura stated that she lacked the ability to produce big combos, requiring players to think of how to make each blow land. He added that she was a character who could scare an opponent into not pushing any buttons as Makoto approaches. Okada states that she is one of the three characters categorized as "evil," or "arashi" ("devastating/rush-down"), gameplay-wise; he explains that she is categorized as such because of her ability to defeat her opponent if the match goes her pace for even a moment. Super Street Fighter IV retains much of her mechanics from 3rd Strike. In both games, Makoto has amongst the slowest walking speed, while having amongst the highest running speed. Okada commented that she was an extreme in both regards, making her a difficult character to get used to for even more experienced players. He adds that players with no experience in fighting games who try her before any other character, they may have no problem controlling her. Tsukamoto, operator of the Street Fighter IV development blog, commented that the inclusion of characters from 3rd Strike gave the development team trouble, specifically mentioning Makoto, who he states was difficult to master, but entertaining to use due to her speed.

Okada commented that Makoto was not intended for beginners, citing her difficulty in dodging projectile attacks. Tamamura added that her lack of range put her at a disadvantage in several situations, requiring players to get close to their opponents in order to show Makoto's potential. When asked who would make a good opponent for Makoto, Okada chose Akuma, due to both having the potential for the match to be an instant knock-out for either. He states that it would be based on who could break the other's defense first. Capcom's Community Manager Seth Killian described her as "the equivalent of poker's "all in"," explaining that this is because if players fight defensively, they will likely lose. He bases her offensive ability in both her command grab and the "threat of a command grab." He cites the range of this grab, describing her as a "mini-Zangief," though more dangerous because of her high running speed. However, he notes that her biggest problem is with players and their psychology rather than characters. He adds that a character such as Zangief would give her problems, commenting that since they share similarities in fighting style, both are best used in close combat.

She has a variety of techniques. One of them is the Karakusa, a grab/choke technique, which allows players to get a free attack after it connects. Okada states that figuring out what attack would be most effective to do while the Karakusa is in effect makes her a fun character. He again commented that the Karakusa was an effective way to dominate a match. The efficiency of her Fukiage, an upward punch technique, was changed from 3rd Strike to Super Street Fighter IV; while she would only take a step forward in performing the attack in the EX version of her attack in 3rd Strike, the Medium and Heavy versions of the attack in Super Street Fighter IV do this as well. Tamamura states that he believes this will make its use more varied. She has other attacks in 3rd Strike, including the Tsurugi kick, the Oroshi karate chop, the seichusen godanzuki, and the abare tosanami. Super Street Fighter IV champion Justin Wong described her 3rd Strike incarnation as offensive and risky, adding that her Super Street Fighter IV incarnation is less so, featuring similar elements yet not as much so. He comments that her focus is on move recovery; her axe kick is fast and can be performed lower than in 3rd Strike. Similarly, her upward punch is faster, both in use and in recovery. However, her dash punch is slower in Super Street Fighter IV.

Another attack is called the Tanden Renki. While it was originally one of her three Super Arts in 3rd Strike, the developers of Super Street Fighter IV made it her Super while the other two were Ultras. The technique provides an increase in power, yet also prevents players from blocking as Makoto while she is using it. Experienced players could use the parry system found in 3rd Strike in order to overcome this, allowing them to rush towards the opponent and deliver significant damage without taking any themselves. Tamamura stated this technique, if used this way, could effectively be used to win a match. Because Super Street Fighter IV lacks a parrying system, the developers considered allowing Makoto to block while the technique is in effect. However, they also feared that this would make her too powerful. They decided to allow Makoto to block while adjusting the balance. Because no moves had time limits in Street Fighter IV or Super Street Fighter IV, they had to add new rules. They considered making it an ultra-combo, similar to Juri's feng shui engine. However, they chose not to, deciding that it would not balance; this resulted in them including both timed ultras and supers.

According to Complex, "she's like a more grounded, slower version of Ibuki. She doesn't have any projectiles, but she doesn't need them, either. In the air, on the ground, or right in front of her, she will get you, and she'll make it look cool doing it. Makoto rules, especially in Super Street Fighter IV." Japanese players using Makoto have won the well-respected Tougeki Street Fighter III 3rd Strike tournament in 2003, 2007, 2008 and 2009.

Other appearances
Makoto appears in the Street Fighter Legends: Ibuki comic book series by UDON Entertainment. In the series, she is depicted as a brash and arrogant martial artist who attends the same school as Ibuki, and ends up becoming her rival. She eventually becomes friends with Ibuki and Elena, and the three girls team up to fight the Geki ninja clan after the villains arrive to kidnap Ibuki. 

She has been also featured through many figures and other merchandise items. To celebrate the 15th Anniversary of the Street Fighter series, Capcom released a bust of Makoto.

Reception
The character was met with a mostly positive reception. G4TV described Makoto as a "fan favorite." Capcom U.S. VP of Strategic Planning & Business Development Christian Svensson commented that Makoto was "sort of the number two in terms of the popularity and "fan fantasy" list."  Capcom's Community Manager Seth Killian called Makoto one of his "personal favorite characters." In a 2018 worldwide poll by Capcom, Makoto was voted second most popular Street Fighter character of them all.

IGN ranked Makoto at number 23 on their list of top Street Fighter characters, praising the degree in motion and detail in the character's animation. IGN also included her in their list of five characters that they wanted in Super Street Fighter IV, commenting that it was not until 3rd Strike that it "found its real star." While stating that she appears to be a "Ryu wannabe," they argue that "in the right hands, she's as powerful as she is stylish, and is quite possible our favourite character from throughout the Street Fighter canon." UGO.com chose Makoto as one of the top 50 best Street Fighter characters, commenting that in spite of her slow walking speed, she is very fast while running. He adds that she is "one of the few characters that wasn't abandoned after Street Fighter III's less than stellar success at the arcades." Game Developer editor in chief Brandon Sheffield commented that he saw a lot of people saying "Makoto being in the game was a decider for me, a major point whether I was going to buy this."

G4tv.com commented that Makoto made the transition from Street Fighter III: 3rd Strike to Super Street Fighter IV particularly well, in spite of Makoto's "previous reliance on Third Strike’s parry system." Retronauts in their podcast about the Street Fighter series highlighted Makoto when the discussion turned to Street Fighter III, describing her as "pure Street Fighter" in relation to the rest of the new cast introduced in III and the difference in their style to Street Fighter II. Eurogamer commented that while he was not a big fan of Makoto in 3rd Strike due to her "risky play-style," Capcom has "subtly toned her down while maintaining her strong offence." GameSpot described her as "one of the deadliest characters in Third Strike in the right hands." GamePro listed her in the mini list of games with androgynous females, describing her as a "tomboy." GameZone commented that "it’s unfathomable to think that anyone could not fall in love with Ibuki and Makoto, introduced in Street Fighter III, all over again."

See also 

 List of Street Fighter characters

References

External links
 Makoto's Street Fighter III entry at StrategyWiki.org

Female characters in video games
Fictional Japanese people in video games
Fictional martial artists in video games
Fictional karateka
Street Fighter characters
Teenage characters in video games
Video game characters introduced in 1999
Woman soldier and warrior characters in video games